92nd meridian may refer to:

92nd meridian east, a line of longitude east of the Greenwich Meridian
92nd meridian west, a line of longitude west of the Greenwich Meridian